The SuperCup Women (or Women SuperCup) is a super cup competition organized by FIBA Europe and contested between the winners of EuroLeague Women and EuroCup Women.

History
The first edition of the Cup took place on October 20, 2009, and was contested between Spartak Moscow Region and Galatasaray in Vidnoye.

The SuperCup Women was in 2015 played in Final Four format between finalists of EuroLeague Women and EuroCup Women.

Finals

Performance by club

See also

 Men's competitions
 EuroLeague
 Basketball Champions League
 EuroCup Basketball
 FIBA Europe Cup
 Women's competitions
 EuroLeague Women
 EuroCup Women
 SuperCup Women

References

External links
 FIBA Europe

 
International club basketball competitions
Women's basketball supercup competitions in Europe
Recurring sporting events established in 2009
2009 establishments in Europe